Torix is a genus of Rhynchobdellid leeches in the family Glossiphoniidae, found in Eastern Asia and Japan. Rana japonica, the Japanese brown frog, is the main host of T. tagoi.

Rickettsia bacterial infection 
Two members of the genus, T. tagoi and T. tukubana, show high percentages of Rickettsia infection in the wild; 96% and 83% respectively, according to a 2003 study. Eggs of T. tagoi were found to all contain the bacteria, indicating the bacteria is almost always passed on to the next generation (vertical transmission). It was found that infected leeches grew far larger than those uninfected with the bacteria. Another paper concluded that the Rickettsia that acted as endosymbionts in the leeches represented a separate clade of Rickettsia, named the torix clade. As T. tagoi feeds on the blood of amphibians such as frogs and newts, it is possible that those amphibians were the route of horizontal transmission.

Species 

The number of species the genus contains is disputed between taxonomic databases. Given below is a complete list; the text in superscript indicates which papers or taxonomic databases support the validity of that species.

 Torix baicalensis Shegolev, 1922 (Sasaki, 2015, Light & Siddall, 1999 Biolib)
 Torix cotylifer Blanchard, 1898 (Sasaki, 2015, Moore, 1930, Lukin & Ephstein, 1960, Biolib)
 Torix mirus Blanchard, 1893 (Sasaki, 2015, Kambayashi et al., 2020, Biolib, GBIF, WoRMS)
 Torix novaezealandiae (Dendy & Olliver, 1900) (Biolib, ADW)
 Torix orientalis (Oka, 1925) (Sasaki, 2015, Biolib)
 Torix tagoi (Oka, 1925) (Sasaki, 2015, Biolib)
 Torix tukubana (Oka, 1935) (Sasaki, 2015, Kambayashi et al., 2020, Biolib, GBIF, WoRMS, NCBI)

References 

Leeches
Annelid genera
Fauna of Asia